A soft landing is any type of aircraft, rocket or spacecraft landing that does not result in significant damage to or destruction of the vehicle or its payload, as opposed to a hard landing.

A soft landing can be achieved by
 Parachute—often this is into water. 
 Vertical rocket power using retrorockets, often referred to as VTVL (vertical landing referred to as VTOL, is usually for aircraft landing in a level attitude, rather than rockets) — first achieved on a suborbital trajectory by Bell Rocket Belt and on an orbital trajectory by the Surveyor 1.
 Horizontal landing, most aircraft and some spacecraft, such as the Space Shuttle, land this way.
 Being caught in midair, as done with Corona spy satellites and followed by some other form of landing.
 Reducing landing speed by impact with the body's surface, known as lithobraking.

Rocketry